James Black Holmes (born 8 December 1954) is a Scottish former footballer.

Career
Holmes began his career at junior club Muirkirk, before moving into the senior game with Partick Thistle before becoming a legend at Greenock Morton. He won three Scottish First Division winners medals: 1977–78, 1983–84 and 1986–87. In May 1987, after being voted the SPFA First Division Footballer of the Year, he captained the Scottish semi-professionals in an end of season tournament against Holland, England & Italy.

He finished off his career with spells at Falkirk, Alloa Athletic and Arbroath, where he was player/coach for a season before retiring in 1991.

Personal life 
His son Graeme Holmes is also a footballer who played for several clubs including Morton.

See also
 List of footballers in Scotland by number of league appearances (500+)

References

External links
 

1954 births
Greenock Morton F.C. players
Scottish footballers
Association football fullbacks
Living people
Scottish Football League players
Scottish Junior Football Association players
Partick Thistle F.C. players
Arbroath F.C. players
Falkirk F.C. players
Alloa Athletic F.C. players
Footballers from Hamilton, South Lanarkshire
Muirkirk Juniors F.C. players